The Dixie Handicap is a 1924 American silent drama film directed by Reginald Barker. The film stars Claire Windsor, Lloyd Hughes, and Otis Harlan. It is written by Waldemar Young.

Plot
As described in a review in a film magazine, Judge Roberts (Keenan), greatly reduced in circumstances, hides his true financial condition from his daughter Virginia. He raises her in luxury by continuingly selling parts of his estate, until all he has left are his old home and his racing mare Southern Melody, who is about to have a colt. Through the carelessness of a stable boy, the mare wanders away and the colt is born in a rainstorm and nearly dies from exposure. When a wild cat attacks, the mare gives her life to save her colt. Dexter (St. Polis), trainer for a millionaire who owns an adjacent training stable, loves Virginia and tells her of her father's poverty. To counteract this, the Judge sells the colt and sends his daughter to Europe. The colt, now named Dixie, is badly injured in its first race, and, when it is about to be shot, Johnny Sheridan (Hughes) begs permission to try and save it. Virginia returns from Europe just as the great Dixie Handicap is to be run, in which the colt Dixie is entered. She learns that her father has sacrificed all and is now living in poverty. Dixie comes from behind and wins the race and a purse of $50,000. The estate is restored and  Virginia, thoroughly chastened, agrees to marry Johnny, who has always loved her.

Cast

Production
The race was filmed at the Latonia Race Track, formerly located at Covington, Kentucky. The character The Old Retainer, a humorous butler for the old house, is played by Otis Harlan in blackface. The use of blackface characters in Hollywood films did not decline until the 1940s when public sensibilities regarding race began to change and blackface became increasingly associated with racism and bigotry.

Preservation
With no prints of The Dixie Handicap located in any film archives, it is a lost film.

References

External links

Stills at silenthollywood.com

1924 films
Metro-Goldwyn-Mayer films
American silent feature films
1924 drama films
American black-and-white films
Silent American drama films
Lost American films
1924 lost films
Lost drama films
Films directed by Reginald Barker
1920s American films